Chesterfield is an unincorporated community that is the county seat of Chesterfield County, Virginia, United States. It was a census-designated place (CDP) at the 2020 census. It was not delineated as a CDP for the 2010 census. The Chesterfield County Courthouse and Courthouse Square are listed in the National Register of Historic Places. The area is also home of the Chesterfield County Government Complex.

Geography

Chesterfield Court House is located at  (37.376449, −77.503798).

Demographics
As of the census of 2000, there were 3,558 people, 1,139 households, and 775 families residing in the CDP. The population density was 1,563.0 people per square mile (602.5/km2). There were 1,171 housing units at an average density of 514.4/sq mi (198.3/km2). The racial makeup of the CDP was 70.24% White, 24.06% African American, 0.70% Native American, 1.46% Asian, 0.08% Pacific Islander, 1.55% from other races, and 1.91% from two or more races. Hispanic or Latino of any race were 3.49% of the population.

There were 1,139 households, out of which 37.0% had children under the age of 18 living with them, 47.4% were married couples living together, 16.9% had a female householder with no husband present, and 31.9% were non-families. 26.1% of all households were made up of individuals, and 4.4% had someone living alone who was 65 years of age or older. The average household size was 2.53 and the average family size was 3.06.

In the CDP the population was spread out, with 24.2% under the age of 18, 10.6% from 18 to 24, 33.4% from 25 to 44, 21.1% from 45 to 64, and 10.8% who were 65 years of age or older. The median age was 35 years. For every 100 females, there were 101.2 males. For every 100 females age 18 and over, there were 98.7 males.

The median income for a household in the CDP was $52,304, and the median income for a family was $60,246. Males had a median income of $37,765 versus $30,211 for females. The per capita income for the CDP was $19,125. About 2.4% of families and 5.2% of the population were below the poverty line, including 4.1% of those under age 18 and 9.6% of those age 65 or over.

Notable people
Denny Hamlin (b. 1980) – NASCAR driver
Mark Parson (b. 1986) – former NFL cornerback for the Houston Texans and New Orleans Saints
Young M.A (b. 1992) – rapper
Devin Robinson (b. 1995) – NBA player for the Toronto Raptors
Devin Druid (b. ) – actor best known for portraying Tyler Down in 13 Reasons Why
Keldon Johnson (b. 1999) – NBA player for the San Antonio Spurs
Howie DiSavino III (b. 2001) - NASCAR driver

See also
 Chesterfield County Public Schools

References

External links
 Village News, local weekly newspaper
 Chesterfield Observer, local online news
 The Chesterfield Historical Society Of Virginia (CHSV)

Unincorporated communities in Chesterfield County, Virginia
Unincorporated communities in Virginia
County seats in Virginia
National Register of Historic Places in Chesterfield County, Virginia